David Manning (born 9 March 1963) is a former English cricketer.  Manning is a right-handed batsman who bowls right-arm off break.  He was born at Wolverhampton, Staffordshire.

Manning represented the Worcestershire Cricket Board in List A cricket.  His debut List A match came against the Kent Cricket Board in the 1999 NatWest Trophy.  From 1999 to 2003, he represented the Board in 8 List A matches, the last of which came against Worcestershire in the 2003 Cheltenham & Gloucester Trophy.  In his 8 List A matches, he scored 169 runs at a batting average of 28.16, with a single half century high score of 80.  In the field he took 4 catches.  In the field he took 3 wickets at a bowling average of 31.33, with best figures of 2/12.

He currently plays club cricket for Wolverhampton Cricket Club in the Birmingham and District Premier League.

References

External links
David Manning at Cricinfo
David Manning at CricketArchive

1963 births
Living people
Cricketers from Wolverhampton
English cricketers
Worcestershire Cricket Board cricketers